Karacabey is a town and district of Bursa Province in the Marmara Region of Turkey. It is located just west of the Simav River near its confluence with the Adirnaz River. District of Karacabey borders districts of Mudanya and Nilüfer from east, ones of Mustafakemalpaşa and Susurluk from south, one of Manyas from southwest and Bandırma from west. It is sited on the ancient town of Miletopolis.

Karacabey is an industrial area as well as an agricultural one. It is known as the plantation area of a special variety of onions. There are many famous food factories around Karacabey such as Nestle and many varieties of vegetables and fruits are planted in Karacabey. There is a nearby lake called Uluabat. The Marmara Sea is 32 km to the north.

History
The town is named for a Turkish soldier during the Ottoman era named Karaca Bey. The former name of the town was Mihalich, after which a cheese was named, while its ancient name was Miletopolis (Greek: Μιλητόπολις). Miletopolis was apparently the chief settlement of a group of people called the Milatæ, whose name was hellenized to suggest a Milesian colony. Its people colonized Gargara. 

Miletopolis was a suffragan of Cyzicus until the 12th or 13th century. Around the end of the twelfth century, it was united with Lopadium as an archbishopric. There are two historical mosques in Karacabey, one being from the 14th century.

From 1867 until 1922, Mihaliç was part of Hüdavendigâr vilayet.

See also
 Ulubatlı Hasan

References

External links
 Karacabey Governorship
 Karacabey Municipality

Populated places in Bursa Province
Milesian colonies
Districts of Bursa Province